Serge Komla Nyuiadzi (born 17 September 1991) is a Togolese professional footballer who plays as a winger or forward for Thai League 1 club  Ratchaburi and the Togo national team.

Career

Nice
Nyuiadzi started to play football at the academy of OGC Nice. During his stay at the club he participated for France U-17 and U-19 teams.
He mainly played for the reserve team of OGC Nice, and during the spring of 2012, he was released by the team.

CSKA Sofia
CSKA Sofia signed Nyuiadzi as a free agent in September 2012. He competed for the team in several friendly matches and scored a goal against Slivnishki geroi.
On 30 September, Nyuiadzi made his debut in the A Group for CSKA in a 3–1 win against Etar 1924. On 20 October he netted his first goal in the professional football for his team in a 1–0 win in the Eternal derby against Levski Sofia. However he did not manage to impress and find his place in the first team and on 12 June 2013 the Bulgarian Football Union announced, that Nyuiadzi's contract with the club had been terminated and he was free to go.

Žalgiris Vilnius and 1461 Trabzon
He eventually continued his career with Lithuanian side Žalgiris Vilnius, having two spells with the club, as well as a short stint with Turkish team 1461 Trabzon sandwiched between them.

FC Taraz
In March 2019, he moved to FC Taraz and scored his first goal.

FC Caspiy
On 11 February 2020, Nyuiadzi signed for FC Caspiy.

International career
Nyuiadzi debuted for the Togo national team in a friendly 2–0 win over Guinea on 5 June 2021.

Honours
Žalgiris Vilnius
Lithuanian Championship: 2013, 2014, 2015
Lithuanian Cup: 2013–14, 2014–15, 2015–16, 2018

References

External links
 
 

1991 births
Living people
Togolese footballers
Togo international footballers
Togolese expatriate footballers
PFC CSKA Sofia players
FK Žalgiris players
FC Astra Giurgiu players
FC Taraz players
FC Caspiy players
FC Ordabasy players
Serge Nyuiadzi
First Professional Football League (Bulgaria) players
A Lyga players
Liga I players
Kazakhstan Premier League players
Serge Nyuiadzi
Association football forwards
Expatriate footballers in Bulgaria
Expatriate footballers in France
Expatriate footballers in Kazakhstan
Expatriate footballers in Lithuania
Expatriate footballers in Romania
Togolese expatriate sportspeople in Bulgaria
Togolese expatriate sportspeople in France
Togolese expatriate sportspeople in Lithuania
Togolese expatriate sportspeople in Romania
21st-century Togolese people